Paris at Midnight is a 1926 silent film drama starring Jetta Goudal and Lionel Barrymore and was directed by E. Mason Hopper. It was distributed by Producers Distributing Corporation. It was based on the novel Le Père Goriot by Honoré de Balzac.

A copy is preserved at the Cinémathèque Française, Paris.

Cast
Jetta Goudal - Delphine
Lionel Barrymore - Vautrin
Mary Brian - Victorine Tallefer
Edmund Burns - Eugene de Rastagnic
Émile Chautard - Pere Goriot
Brandon Hurst - Count Tarrefer
Jocelyn Lee - Anastasie
Mathilde Comont - Madame Vauquer
Carrie Daumery - Madmoiselle Miche
Fannie Yantis - Julie
Jean De Briac - Frederic Tallefer
Charles Requa - Maxime de Trailers

See also
Lionel Barrymore filmography

References

External links

Lantern slide (*if page does not load click on the worthpoint link, then click back)

1926 films
American silent feature films
Films based on works by Honoré de Balzac
Films directed by E. Mason Hopper
1926 drama films
Silent American drama films
American black-and-white films
Producers Distributing Corporation films
1920s American films